Božena Blaće ( Erceg; born 31 December 1981) is a Croatian female basketball player.

Sources
Profile at eurobasket.com

1981 births
Living people
Sportspeople from Knin
Croatian women's basketball players
Croatian Women's Basketball League players
Mediterranean Games gold medalists for Croatia
Competitors at the 2001 Mediterranean Games
Mediterranean Games silver medalists for Croatia
Competitors at the 2005 Mediterranean Games
Mediterranean Games medalists in basketball